Megophthalmus is a genus of true bugs belonging to the family Cicadellidae.

The species of this genus are found in Europe.

Species:
 Megophthalmus scabripennis Edwards, 1915 
 Megophthalmus scanica Fallén, 1806

References

Cicadellidae
Hemiptera genera